Christian Wiman is an American poet and editor born in 1966 and raised in the small west Texas town of Snyder.  He graduated from Washington and Lee University and has taught at Northwestern University, Stanford University, Lynchburg College in Virginia, and the Prague School of Economics. In 2003, he became editor of the oldest American magazine of verse, Poetry, a role he stepped down from in June 2013. Wiman is now on the faculty of Yale University, where he teaches courses on Religion and Literature at Yale Divinity School and the Yale Institute of Sacred Music.

His first book of poetry, The Long Home (Story Line Press, 1997) and reprinted by Copper Canyon Press (2007), won the Nicholas Roerich Prize. His 2010 book, Every Riven Thing (Farrar, Straus and Giroux, 2010), was chosen by poet and critic Dan Chiasson as one of the best poetry books of 2010. His book Ambition and Survival: Becoming a Poet (Copper Canyon Press, 2007) reviewed by The New York Times Sunday Book Review, is "a collection of personal essays and critical prose on a wide range of subjects: reading Paradise Lost in Guatemala, recalling violent episodes from the poet's youth, traveling in Africa with an eccentric father, as well as a series of penetrating essays on poets, poetry, and poetry's place in our lives. The book concludes with a portrait of Wiman's diagnosis with a rare cancer, and a clear-eyed declaration of what it means — for an artist and a person — to have faith in the face of death."

His poems, criticism, and personal essays appear widely in such magazines as The Atlantic, Harper’s, The New York Times Book Review, The New Yorker and The Sewanee Review. Clive James  describes Wiman's poems as being “insistent on being read aloud, in a way that so much from America is determined not to be. His rhymes and line-turnovers are all carefully placed to intensify the speech rhythms, making everything dramatic: not shoutingly so, but with a steady voice that tells an ideal story every time.”

Literary style and influences

Though Wiman does at times write in free verse, a significant enough portion of his work is written with some measure of form for him to have been associated at times with movements of New Formalism. On the topic of form, Wiman wrote in an essay called “An Idea of Order”:

 
Major critics and Wiman himself, however, have distinguished his work from neo-formalism. David Biespeil in American Poetry Review wrote, "if Wiman is a formalist, he's the kind who ditches the grandiose". Wiman's poetry takes its reference points from lived experience rather than from any literary tradition. Of his own taste, Wiman writes in Ambition and Survival "more and more what I want from the poetry I read is some density of experience, some sense that a whole life is being brought to bear both on and in language".

Wiman's poetry is characterized by multiple possible and intended readings, and metaphors which either are derived from an absence or space or undergo an evolution throughout the poem. One technique Wiman uses to communicate dual intended readings, is through repetition and scrupulous variation of punctuation and line-breaks. Thematic preoccupations of Wiman's poetry include the absence of God and difficulties and necessities of encountering the world whether with faith or without. Omar Sabbagh compares Wiman to Simone Weil and Jürgen Moltmann saying "Whether we call it 'affliction', 'the void', or what have you, these Christian thinkers were eminently modernist in seeing God, not as necessity, but as 'contingency'."
 
Wiman's poetry has been compared stylistically to Seamus Heaney and Geoffrey Hill, but in an interview on his own influences, Wiman said, "for sheer sound, though, I'd give more credit—or blame—to  Basil Bunting, Lorine Niedecker, and Robert Frost".

Awards and honors

2010 Commonwealth Prize from the English Speaking Union
2012 Guggenheim Fellowship
2014 National Book Critics Circle Award (Poetry) finalist for Once in the West
2014 Balcones Fiction Prize (Poetry) winner for Once in the West
2016 Aiken Taylor Award for Modern American Poetry

Works

Poetry

Collections
 The Long Home (Copper Canyon Press, 1998), poetry, 96 pages, 
 Hard Night (Copper Canyon Press, 2005), poetry, 96 pages, 
 Every Riven Thing (Farrar, Straus and Giroux, 2011), poetry, 112 pages, 
 Once In The West (Farrar, Straus and Giroux, 2014), poetry, 128 pages, 
 Hammer Is The Prayer: Selected Poems (Farrar, Straus and Giroux, 2016), poetry, 224 pages, 
 Survival Is A Style (Farrar, Straus and Giroux, 2020), poetry, 112 pages,

Translations
 Stolen Air: The Selected Poems of Osip Mandelstam (Ecco, 2012), poetry, 128 pages,

Anthologies

Prose
Ambition and Survival: Becoming a Poet (Copper Canyon Press, 2007)
My Bright Abyss: Meditation of a Modern Believer (Farrar, Straus and Giroux, 2013)
He Held Radical Light: The Art of Faith, the Faith of Art (Farrar, Straus and Giroux, 2018)
The Cancer Chair:  Is suffering meaningless? (Harper's Magazine, February 2020, pgs 51–57)

References

Further reading

External links
 Video interview: "Bill Moyers & Company" > February 2012 > "An Interview with poet Christian Wiman"
 Audio: The Cortland Review > Issue 32 > Interior by Christian Wiman
 Interview: Bookslut > March 2009 > An Interview with Christian Wiman
 Feature: Image > July 2009 > Artist of the Month: Christian Wiman
 Interview: Poets & Writers > August 7, 2007 > An Interview with Poet Christian Wiman by Kevin Nance

American male poets
American magazine editors
Poets from Illinois
The New Yorker people
Poets from Texas
Washington and Lee University alumni
1966 births
Living people
American male non-fiction writers